Amir Karić (born 31 December 1973) is a Slovenian football coach and former player who is the head coach of Slovenian Women's League team Mura. Primarily a left-back, he also played as a midfielder.

Club career
After his impressive performances at the 2000 European Championships, Karić was brought to English football by Ipswich Town in August 2000 for £700,000.

His appearances for Ipswich were limited to three in the League Cup before he was sent out on loan to Crystal Palace in March 2001, where he only played three matches. His loan spell at Palace was then cut short and the player returned to Ipswich. Karić's contract at Ipswich was terminated by mutual consent in October 2002.

After that, he played for Moscow. In 2005–06 he played for the Cypriot team Anorthosis. During his career he also played for Rudar Velenje, AEL Limassol, Gamba Osaka and for Koper.

International career
Karić played for Slovenia at UEFA Euro 2000 and at the 2002 FIFA World Cup.

Personal life
His son Sven and daughter Tija are footballers.

Career statistics

Club

International

References

External links
 NZS profile 
 
 
 

1973 births
Living people
Slovenian people of Bosniak descent
Slovenian people of Bosnia and Herzegovina descent
Slovenian footballers
Association football fullbacks
Association football midfielders
Slovenian PrvaLiga players
NK Rudar Velenje players
NK Maribor players
NK Železničar Maribor players
Gamba Osaka players
Ipswich Town F.C. players
Crystal Palace F.C. players
English Football League players
FC Moscow players
Russian Premier League players
NK Mura players
AEL Limassol players
FC Koper players
Cypriot First Division players
NK IB 1975 Ljubljana players
NK Olimpija Ljubljana (2005) players
Anorthosis Famagusta F.C. players
J1 League players
Slovenian Second League players
UEFA Euro 2000 players
2002 FIFA World Cup players
Slovenian expatriate footballers
Expatriate footballers in England
Expatriate footballers in Japan
Expatriate footballers in Russia
Expatriate footballers in Cyprus
Expatriate footballers in Austria
Slovenian expatriate sportspeople in England
Slovenian expatriate sportspeople in Japan
Slovenian expatriate sportspeople in Russia
Slovenian expatriate sportspeople in Cyprus
Slovenian expatriate sportspeople in Austria
Slovenia under-21 international footballers
Slovenia international footballers
Slovenian football managers